Théodore Baron (19 August 1840, Ixelles - 4 September 1899, Saint-Servais) was a Belgian landscape painter in the Realistic style.

Biography 
He was initially trained in the Academic style; first by Hippolyte de la Charlerie in Brussels, then by Louis Dubois, Guillaume Van der Hecht, and François-Joseph Navez. In 1863, together with Louis Artan, he explored the wooded areas around Brussels and came into contact with artists painting en plein aire. During that time, he developed a predilection for creating more realistic landscapes than those he had studied.

From 1865 to 1868, he lived in Kalmthout and focused on painting the typically desolate landscapes found in the Campine region. He also spent some time working in Hoeilaart and Auderghem, painting the old ponds in the vicinity of the Red Cloister. That same year, he became a co-founder of the Société Libre des Beaux-Arts.

He was constantly moving about; painting in the Meuse river valley and along the river Lesse. He also worked with Félicien Rops and Octave Maus at an artists' retreat in Anseremme. In 1870, he stayed with the art critic, Camille Lemonnier, at his home near Profondeville. Later, he travelled as far as France and Italy.

In 1882, he became a teacher at the Academy of Fine Arts in Namur, replacing Ferdinand Marinus. His best known students there include Isidore Verheyden and Hippolyte de la Charlerie. In 1884, he was appointed the Academy's Director, and remained in that position until his death. Streets have been named after him in Auderghem and Namur where a monument, created by Charles van der Stappen, has been erected.

Sources 
 Herman De Vilder, "De School van Tervuren : in de bedding van de tijd"; De Vrienden van de School van Tervuren, 2008 
 Hoozee R., "Barbizon en België"; in: "De School van Barbizon"; exhibition catalog, Museum voor Schone Kunst, Ghent 1985 
 Paul Piron, De Belgische beeldende kunstenaars uit de 19de en 20ste eeuw, 2nd ed., 1999, 
 E. Benezit, Dictionnaire des Peintres, Sculpteurs, Dessinateurs et Graveurs; Librairie Gründ, Paris 1976

External links

 More works by Baron @ ArtNet

1840 births
1899 deaths
People from Ixelles
19th-century Belgian painters
19th-century Belgian male artists